Bay Darnell (February 4, 1931 – February 28, 2023) is an American racing driver from Lake Bluff, Illinois.  He raced mainly in USAC Stock Cars, but he did have a few Indy Car and NASCAR Grand National Series starts. His grandson Erik Darnell is a current NASCAR driver.

Racing career

Early career
Darnell began racing Modifieds on the dirt tracks in northern Illinois and southern Wisconsin, especially Waukegan Speedway.

USAC Stock Car
Darnell began racing in USAC Stock Car in 1962. He became the second driver to land in Lake Lloyd at the Daytona International Speedway during a rare appearance in an ARCA stock car. He went into the infield lake during a February 8, 1964 qualifying race for the ARCA 250. 

Darnell finished third in the season points in 1973, his first time in the top three.  In 1974, Darnell had his first USAC win at the Indiana State Fairgrounds after racing for 13 seasons. He led the final five laps at the one mile dirt oval. Darnell was forced to race his asphalt car after his dirt car was wrecked during the previous week's race at the Springfield Mile.  Darnell drove with a broken shoulder from the earlier incident. Darnell's second USAC victory happened on the clay at the 100-mile race at DuQuoin State Fairgrounds Racetrack on August 28, 1976. His third USAC stock car win happened on June 5 in the following year at Texas World Speedway. After starting tenth, he won on the two-mile asphalt superspeedway. He took the lead on lap 148 of 250.

In the middle of the 1978 season he finished fifth at Springfield. The following week he was ruled to have jumped the final restart prematurely at DuQuoin and he was awarded a second-place finish instead of the win. In an interview with the Milwaukee Sentinel, Darnell talked about how he felt that he could win the championship that year. After having mechanical difficulties in the August 17th race at the Milwaukee Mile caused him to lose hundreds of points in the third last race of the season, he said, "If I hadn't fallen out of the Milwaukee 150, I'd be ahead (in points) right now." Darnell finished third in points that season. The following year he earned his career-best second points finish, one position better than Rusty Wallace. He dropped to third in the 1980 season points and tied his career-best second-place points finish in 1982. He earned his final USAC victory on August 15 of that year on the dirt at the Springfield Mile. He raced his final USAC race in the middle of 1983 and the series folded after running only two events in 1984.

NASCAR
Darnell made three NASCAR Grand National Series starts in his career.  In 1954 he started 17th at the only NASCAR race Santa Fe Speedway in Willow Springs, Illinois. His car overheated and he retired at the 18th lap of the race finishing last in the 23 car field. He made his second start in 1964, starting 23rd for Holman Moody at Atlanta International Raceway. In a race of high attrition, he completed 205 of 334 laps before ending with push rod failure to finish 13th in the 39-car field. His final NASCAR start was in 1967 when he raced in his own car at Atlanta. He started 39th and finished 32nd in the 44-car field.

Indy Car
Darnell raced in three Indy Car races. His first champ car start was at the DuQuoin in 1965.  He finished ninth in the 18-car field. Darnell returned for this final two Indy Car races in 1968.  He raced at Trenton Speedway, finishing 14th with engine problems.  Later that season, he raced at his home race at the Milwaukee Mile. He was involved in a wreck on the second lap and finished 23rd.

Business
Darnell owned a trucking company in the Chicago area. He also built USAC stock cars and in 1977 the St. Petersburg Times called him a "master car builder" who "builds and maintains his own equipment which is considered among the best."

Personal life
Darnell is the father of Danny Darnell, a well-known Midwestern short-track driver, and grandfather of NASCAR driver Erik Darnell.

Motorsports career results

NASCAR
(key) (Bold – Pole position awarded by qualifying time. Italics – Pole position earned by points standings or practice time. * – Most laps led.)

Grand National Series

Daytona 500

References

External links
 

Living people
1931 births
People from Lake Bluff, Illinois
Racing drivers from Illinois
NASCAR drivers
USAC Stock Car drivers
ARCA Menards Series drivers
Champ Car drivers
American Speed Association drivers